The Men's 3 metre springboard competition of the diving events at the 2015 World Aquatics Championships was held on 30–31 July 2015.

Results
The preliminary round was held on 30 July at 09:30. The semifinal was held on 30 July at 15:00. The final was held on 31 July at 19:30.

Green denotes finalists

Blue denotes semifinalists

References

Men's 3 metre springboard